The DBAG Class 145 and DBAG Class 146 are Bo′Bo′ mainline electric locomotives built by Adtranz primarily for the Deutsche Bahn at the end of the 1990s. The Class 145 is the freight version for DB Cargo; the Class 146 is the passenger version for DB Regio. Additional freight machines were built for the former Swiss railway Mittelthurgaubahn as well as for various private operators and leasing companies.

The classes of locomotives are predecessors of the Bombardier TRAXX locomotives.

Background and design 

The AdTranz DBAG Class 145 derives from the prototype locomotive 128 001 (also known as 12X) (see DBAG Class 128) that was built by AEG and Henschel; like competitor Krauss-Maffei’s 127 001 (See EuroSprinter), it uses asynchronous electric motors to drive the locomotive: based on experiences gained from DB Class 120.

Orders and operators

Freight versions 

The prototype resulted in an order from DB AG for eighty locomotives for medium-weight freight trains. These locomotives were delivered starting in 1997. By the end of production in 2000, 80 locomotives had been produced; built for DB Cargo. Later the locomotives were inherited by the successor organisations Railion followed by DB Schenker.

A further six units were built for the Swiss private railway the Mittelthurgaubahn in 2000 where they were designated Re 486; after the company's bankruptcy in 2002 the locomotives were sold to SBB Cargo, working as Re 481. The locomotives were not homologated for operations in Switzerland - only Germany - being operated by the Swiss federal railways' German subsidiary. This continued until 2005 when they were sold to the leasing company MRCE and subsequently operated for various private operators in Germany.

17 further units were produced between 1999 and 2001 for various private operators and leasing companies; including five for CBrail, six for Locomotion Capital (now Alpha Trains), two for Rail4chem (via leasing company Deutsche Leasing) and others.

Passenger versions 
These locomotives were given the designation DBAG Class 146. An additional 32 were ordered in August 2012.

References and notes

Notes

References

Other sources 
BR146.de "Pictures, information and technology of the modern three-phase AC locomotives"  br146.de
technische Daten BR 145/146 Technical data for Classes 145/146

External links 
 
Baureihe 145 and Baureihe 146: Images and brief details of Classes 145 and 146 lokomotive-online.de

145
Electric locomotives of Germany
15 kV AC locomotives
Bo′Bo′ locomotives
Adtranz locomotives
Railway locomotives introduced in 1997
Standard gauge locomotives of Germany
Standard gauge locomotives of Switzerland